There have been two baronetcies created for persons with the surname Nelson, both in the Baronetage of the United Kingdom. Both creations are extant as of 2010.

Nelson baronets, of Acton Park (1912)
The Nelson Baronetcy, of Acton Park in Acton in the County of Denbigh, was created in the Baronetage of the United Kingdom on 5 February 1912 for William Nelson, Chairman of Nelson Line Ltd, of Liverpool, and of the Nelson Steam Navigation Company. As of 2006 the presumed fourth holder of the title has not successfully proven his succession to the baronetcy and is consequently not on the Official Roll of the Baronetage, with the baronetcy considered dormant.
Sir William Nelson, 1st Baronet (1851–1921)
Sir James Hope Nelson, 2nd Baronet (1883–1960) who married Isabel Valle on 27 September 1913. Valle was the daughter of Dr. Jules Felix Valle (born 1859) and Mary A. Clover, of St. Louis, Missouri.
Sir William Vernon Hope Nelson, 3rd Baronet (1914–1991)
Jamie Charles Vernon Hope, presumed 4th Baronet (born 1949)

Nelson baronets, of Hilcote Hall (1955)

The Nelson Baronetcy, of Hilcote Hall in the County of Stafford, was created in the Baronetage of the United Kingdom on 11 July 1955 for Sir George Nelson. In 1960 he was raised to the peerage as Baron Nelson of Stafford.
George Horatio Nelson, 1st Baron Nelson of Stafford (1887–1962)
Henry George Nelson, 2nd Baron Nelson of Stafford (1917–1995)
Henry Roy George Nelson, 3rd Baron Nelson of Stafford (1943–2006)
Alistair William Henry Nelson, 4th Baron Nelson of Stafford (born 1973)

References

Further reading
Kidd, Charles, Williamson, David (editors). Debrett's Peerage and Baronetage (1990 edition). New York: St Martin's Press, 1990, 

Baronetcies in the Baronetage of the United Kingdom